Alfredas is a Lithuanian masculine given name and may refer to:

Alfredas Bumblauskas (born 1956), Lithuanian historian
Alfredas Kulpa-Kulpavičius (1923–2007), Lithuanian architect and artist 
Alfredas Naujokas (1911–1966), SS-Sturmbannführer 
Alfredas Skroblas (born 1984), Lithuanian football player

Lithuanian masculine given names